is a Japanese manga series by Hiroshi Motomiya. The storyline is set in the Three Kingdoms period, when Western Shu, Northern Wei and Eastern Wu battled to conquer all of China.

Plot
Liu Bei is a descendant of Liu Sheng, prince Jing of Zhongshan of the Han Dynasty. Cao Cao is the adopted grandchild of Cao Teng, a eunuch in the palace. Sun Jian is the governor of Jiangdong. The three show their marvelous leading-role to divide China to three states: Shu, Wei and Wu.

A significant difference is the use of fantasy elements; for example, many villains in the beginning are monsters as opposed to humans. Liu Bei meets a beautiful giant heavenly being in heaven, and she gives him the power to conquer the country. He meets and swears to be brothers with Guan Yu and Zhang Fei.

Video games
The manga has the following video game adaptations by Capcom:

Arcade video games
Dynasty Wars (Tenchi wo Kurau)
Warriors of Fate (Tenchi wo Kurau 2: Sekiheki no Tatakai)

Famicom/NES games
Destiny of an Emperor (Tenchi wo Kurau)
Tenchi wo Kurau II

Manga series
Works based on Romance of the Three Kingdoms